The Technical Naval Museum (Museo Tecnico Navale) in La Spezia is a naval museum mainly related to the Italian Navy. It is located at the main entrance of the Naval Arsenal.

Purpose and Overview

Unlike the Naval Museum of Venice, which is more concerned with general maritime history and the naval history of the Venetian Republic in particular, the focus of the Naval Museum of La Spezia is more technical. Its main specialty is the equipment of the Italian Navy special forces, which were founded in La Spezia and are still stationed there.

History

In 1860 and 1861, the naval forces of other Italian states were incorporated into the Marine of Savoy which therefore became the Italian Navy (Regia Marina). At the same time the Naval Museum in Genoa acquitted exhibits from the integrated navies. In the years under the direction of Domenico Chiodo the new naval port of La Spezia was founded, and in 1870 all the departments of the Navy based in Genoa, including the Marine Museum moved to La Spezia. 
The Museum received its present name Museo Tecnico Navale in 1923, at the same time as the Naval History Museum in Venice was reestablished.

During World War II La Spezia was attacked by the Allies repeatedly from the air. The naval base, the Arsenal and the Naval Museum suffered heavy destruction. A new building to house the remaining or restored exhibits was opened on 12 May 1958

External links
 Official Website (it.)
 Information on laspezia.net

Naval museums
Military and war museums in Italy
La Spezia
Museums in Liguria
Maritime museums in Italy
Italian Navy